Kevin Spencer is an animated Canadian television series developed by Greg Lawrence, which originally aired on CTV and The Comedy Network. The show is aimed at adult audiences, and takes its name from the main character, taking place in Ottawa, Ontario. It is based on the shorts of the same name that premiered on Mondo Media's flash cartoon site and CTV in 1999. It also aired on Burly Bear Network and Spike TV in the US.

Characters
The show revolves around the everyday happenings of the Spencer family. Kevin himself is a 16-year-old, chain-smoking, alcoholic, cough syrup-addicted, sociopathic juvenile delinquent. He lives with his parents, whom he often shows ambivalence towards, and is a student at a local high school, although he rarely attends school. It is demonstrated multiple times throughout the series that Kevin is mentally unstable, as he is prone to random outbursts of violence, even towards himself, shows signs of insanity, and has a complete disregard for life, including his own. It is also shown that Kevin is probably mentally challenged, as he often has difficulties with performing the simplest of tasks, such as making himself a bowl of cereal, forgetting what he was talking about the instant after saying something, or even realizing that he was hungry, yet at times throughout the series makes very well-articulated statements about certain aspects of society, culture, politics, and education, possibly indicating Kevin is a savant. Throughout the series, Kevin almost never speaks, aside from during dream sequences and occasional one-sentenced outbursts. Instead, the show's narrator (voiced by Lawrence) speaks for Kevin; that is, he describes what Kevin is saying, thinking, and how Kevin reacts to the world around him.

His parents, Anastasia (voiced by Thomasin Langlands) and Percy (voiced by Lawrence), are also alcoholic, cough syrup-addicted chain-smokers. Both are crude, overweight, unattractive and extraordinarily stupid people who live off of welfare. Both parents neglect or otherwise use Kevin for their own selfish gains, and both show clear signs of sociopathic tendencies. Neither parent is faithful to the other, and Anastasia in particular is highly promiscuous. Their antics usually involve attempting to gain money or alcohol through illegal acts, which quite randomly succeed or fail. While both parents primarily show hatred and disgust towards one another, both occasionally demonstrate a small degree of lust for each other, though these moments rarely last longer than a scene of an episode.

Another frequent character in the show is Kevin's imaginary friend, Allen the Magic Goose (voiced by Mike Wetmore). Allen often encourages Kevin's sociopathic nature, usually asking him to do illegal, indecent, and/or dangerous things simply for the sake of the thrill or for vengeance. However, Kevin, being a sociopath, often shows ambivalence towards Allen, sometimes threatening or intimidating the bird. During such times, Allen often reminds Kevin of the futility of these outbursts, since Kevin is simply imagining Allen's existence.

Charlie Plunt (voiced by Mike Wetmore) is Percy's friend.

Streaming
Ocnus Productions (creators of Kevin Spencer) sold the rights to the series around May/June 2011 to Netflix. The seasons were therefore removed from Expressmedia.ca where Manufacture-On-Demand DVDs had been available for sale for several years. All 8 seasons were made available in the US on Netflix's streaming service July 15, 2011, although as of December 2011 the show failed to appear on Netflix's Canadian version of the streaming service. On July 17, 2012, Netflix stopped featuring it altogether. Seasons 1 and 2 were later added on to Hulu the same year. All 8 seasons of the series are currently available on Amazon Prime Video, Plex (software), and Tubi.

References

External links
Tv.com summary

1998 Canadian television series debuts
2005 Canadian television series endings
1990s Canadian adult animated television series
1990s Canadian animated comedy television series
1990s Canadian high school television series
2000s Canadian adult animated television series
2000s Canadian animated comedy television series
2000s Canadian high school television series
Canadian adult animated comedy television series
English-language television shows
CTV Comedy Channel original programming
Animated television series about dysfunctional families
Teen animated television series
Television shows filmed in Ottawa
Television shows set in Ottawa